Jeffrey Robert Haines (born October 6, 1958) is an American prelate of the Roman Catholic Church who has been serving as Auxiliary Bishop of the Archdiocese of Milwaukee in Wisconsin since 2017. He also serves as rector of the Cathedral of St. John the Evangelist in Milwaukee.

Biography

Early life 
Jeffrey Haines was born in Milwaukee, Wisconsin, on October 6, 1958, to Jim and Maureen (“Mo”) Haines.  He has three siblings, John, Rick, and Anne. Haines was baptized at St. Elizabeth Parish in Milwaukee before the family moved to New Berlin, Wisconsin, in 1965. Haines attended Holy Apostles School in New Berlin, and then New Berlin West High School, graduating in 1977. 

Haines began his college studies at the University of Wisconsin-Oshkosh before transferring to Marquette University.  He graduated from Marquette in 1981 with a Bachelor of Theology degree. Haines then attended Saint Francis de Sales Seminary in St. Francis, Wisconsin, earning a Master of Divinity degree in 1985.

Priesthood 
On May 17, 1985, Haines was ordained to the priesthood for the Archdiocese of Milwaukee by Archbishop Archbishop Weakland. After his ordination, Haines was appointed as associate pastor of St. Nicholas Parish in Milwaukee. In 1987, he was given additional responsibilities as associate pastor of Holy Redeemer Parish in Milwaukee. In 1991, he was appointed associate pastor of St. Eugene Parish in Fox Point, Wisconsin. Haines was appointed pastor in 1996 of St. Frances Cabrini Parish in West Bend, Wisconsin.

Haines went to Washington D.C. in 2002 to study canon law at Catholic University of America. Returning to Milwaukee the next year, he was named as temporary administrator of St. Patrick Parish in Whitewater, Wisconsin. In 2003, Haines returned as pastor to St. Frances Cabrini Parish, then in 2004 also appointed to assist at Immaculate Conception/St. Mary’s Parish in West Bend. In 2011, Haines became rector of the Cathedral of St. John the Evangelist in Milwaukee.

Haines occasionally interrupts his pastoral work for “pilgrimages” to Miller Park to watch the Milwaukee Brewers, and to the Grand Ole Opry in Nashville to listen to country music.

Auxiliary Bishop of Milwaukee
Pope Francis appointed Haines as an auxiliary bishop for the Archdiocese of Milwaukee on January 25, 2017. On March 17, 2017, Haines was consecrated by Archbishop Jerome Listecki at the Cathedral of St. John the Evangelist Haines is still serving as rector and pastor of the Cathedral Parish. He was three times elected moderator of the Archdiocesan Council of Priests, and currently is a member of the College of Consultors.

See also

 Catholic Church hierarchy
 Catholic Church in the United States
 Historical list of the Catholic bishops of the United States
 List of Catholic bishops of the United States
 Lists of patriarchs, archbishops, and bishops

References

External links
  Roman Catholic Archdiocese of Milwaukee Official Site

1958 births
Living people
Religious leaders from Milwaukee
Marquette University alumni
University of Wisconsin–Oshkosh alumni
Roman Catholic Archdiocese of Milwaukee
21st-century Roman Catholic bishops in the United States
Bishops appointed by Pope Francis